Paul Monje House is a historic home located at Washington, Franklin County, Missouri. It was built about 1908, and is a -story, brick dwelling with a side ell on a stone foundation.  It has a gable roof and segmental arched door and window openings.  A front porch which extends the width of the side ell.

It was listed on the National Register of Historic Places in 2000.

References

Houses on the National Register of Historic Places in Missouri
Houses completed in 1908
Buildings and structures in Franklin County, Missouri
National Register of Historic Places in Franklin County, Missouri